Hans Pape (1 October 1894 – 30 November 1970) was a German painter. His work was part of the painting event in the art competition at the 1932 Summer Olympics. He trained and worked in Münster.

References

External links
 

1894 births
1970 deaths
20th-century German painters
20th-century German male artists
German male painters
Olympic competitors in art competitions
Painters from Hamburg